Cape Pattisson is a headland in the northwest of Chatham Island, the largest island in the Chatham Islands chain, located 800 km east of New Zealand's South Island.

References

Pattisson
Chatham Island